Uncanney Valley is the fifth and final studio album by American indie rock band The Dismemberment Plan. The album was released on Partisan Records on October 14, 2013, and is the band's first album since their initial break-up following the release of 2001's Change. Three singles from the album were released on streaming services prior to the album's release: "Waiting", "Invisible", and "Daddy Was a Real Good Dancer". The release of the lead single "Waiting" was teased with a promotional phone line that when dialed would play the song in low audio quality; the song would later receive a music video on October 16.

Track listing

Personnel

The Dismemberment Plan
 Eric Axelson – bass guitar, keyboards
 Jason Caddell – guitar, keyboards
 Joe Easley – drums
 Travis Morrison – vocals, guitar, keyboards

Additional personnel
 Paul Kolderie – mixing
 Ken Rich – label design
 J. Robbins – engineering
 Bob Weston – mastering

Charts

References

2013 albums
The Dismemberment Plan albums
Partisan Records albums